Podopteryx casuarina is a species of flat-wing damselfly in the family Argiolestidae.

The IUCN conservation status of Podopteryx casuarina is "DD", data deficient, risk undetermined.

References

Further reading

 

Calopterygoidea
Articles created by Qbugbot
Insects described in 1949